France have participated 7 times at the UEFA Women's Championship: Their best achievement is reaching the 
UEFA Women's Championships  semi finals in (2022). Since Euro 1997, France have reached at least the quarter finals.

UEFA Women's Championship 

*Draws include knockout matches decided by penalty shootout.

References 

 
Euro
Countries at the UEFA Women's Championship